Boaz Meylink (born 22 March 1984 in Deventer) is a Dutch Olympic rower. He competed at the 2012 Summer Olympics in London and the 2016 Summer Olympics in Rio de Janeiro. At the 2016 Summer Olympics in Rio de Janeiro he was part of the men's eight team that won a bronze medal.

In 2013 he became European Champion and World Champion in the men's coxless four. Through the years he won several World Cup medals in the men's eight and men's coxless four.

He finished 5th in the coxless four at the 2012 Summer Olympics in London.

External links
 

1984 births
Living people
Dutch male rowers
Rowers at the 2012 Summer Olympics
Olympic rowers of the Netherlands
Sportspeople from Deventer
World Rowing Championships medalists for the Netherlands
Rowers at the 2016 Summer Olympics
Olympic bronze medalists for the Netherlands
Olympic medalists in rowing
Medalists at the 2016 Summer Olympics
European Rowing Championships medalists